Liolaemus fittkaui is a species of lizard in the family  Liolaemidae. The species is endemic to Bolivia.

Etymology
The specific name, fittkaui, is in honor of German herpetologist Ernst Josef Fittkau.

Geographic range
L. fittkaui is found in Cochabamba Department, Bolivia.

References

fittkaui
Reptiles described in 1986
Reptiles of Bolivia
Taxa named by Raymond Laurent